The 2008 United States Senate election in Tennessee was held on November 4, 2008, to elect a member of the U.S. Senate from the State of Tennessee. Incumbent Republican U.S. Senator Lamar Alexander won re-election to a second term.

Alexander flipped reliably Democratic Davidson County, home to Nashville which has not voted Republican on a presidential level since 1988. With that, he also won 65.1% of the vote against Democrat Bob Tuke, who won just 32.6%. Alexander also won 28% of the African American vote.

Democratic primary

Candidates 
 Bob Tuke, former Chairman of the Democratic Party of Tennessee
 Gary Davis, perennial candidate
 Mike Padgett, former Knox County Clerk
 Mark E. Clayton, insurance agent
 Kenneth Eaton, businessman and Nashville mayoral candidate in 2003 and 2007
 Leonard Ladner, truck-driver

Campaign 
Mike Padgett finished third after Gary Davis, who did not campaign and used no money. Many were surprised at the results. They claimed that perhaps there was name confusion, with two incumbent congressmen David Davis and Lincoln Davis.

Results

Republican primary

Candidates 
 Lamar Alexander, incumbent U.S. Senator

Results

General election

Candidates

Major 
 Lamar Alexander (R), incumbent U.S. Senator and former Governor
 Bob Tuke (D), Chairman of the Democratic Party of Tennessee (2005–2007)

Minor 
In Tennessee, a candidate seeking a House or Senate seat at the state or national level must gather 25 signatures from registered voters to be put on the ballot for any elected office. Presidential candidates seeking to represent an officially recognized party must either be named as candidates by the Tennessee Secretary of State or gather 2,500 signatures from registered voters, and an independent candidate for President must gather 275 signatures and put forward a full slate of eleven candidates who have agreed to serve as electors.  In order to be recognized as a party and have its candidates listed on the ballot under that party's name, a political party must gather signatures equal to or in excess of 2.5% of the total number of votes cast in the last election (about 45,000 signatures based on the election held in 2006). The last third party to be officially recognized was the American Party in 1968; none of its candidates received five percent of the statewide vote in 1970 and it was then subject to desertification as an official party.. Due to these hurdles third party candidates almost always appear on the ballot as independents.

 Edward Buck (I)
 Christopher Fenner (I)
 David "None of the Above" Gatchell (I)
 Bo Heyward (I)
 Ed Lawhorn (I)
 Daniel T. Lewis (L)
 Chris Lugo (I), Green party peace activist

Campaign 
On April 3, 2007, Alexander confirmed that he would seek re-election to the Senate in 2008. Alexander has remained a popular figure in Tennessee since his first term as governor and faced no opposition in the Republican primary Tuke is a former Marine who served in the Vietnam War. Tuke served as Barack Obama's Presidential campaign chair in Tennessee. Tuke declared himself to be a candidate March 3, 2008, and he secured the help of several high profile Democratic campaigners including Joe Trippi. There were many minor candidates in the race. Chris Lugo announced on January 17 that he was seeking the nomination of the Democratic Party as a 'Progressive Democrat.'   In March 2008, Lugo announced he was dropping his candidacy for the Democratic nomination, and would run either for the Green Party nomination or as an independent.

Predictions

Polling

Results

See also 
 2008 United States Senate elections

References

External links 
 Division of Elections from the Tennessee Department of State
 U.S. Congress candidates for Tennessee at Project Vote Smart
 Tennessee, U.S. Senate from CQ Politics
 Tennessee U.S. Senate from OurCampaigns.com
 Tennessee Senate race from 2008 Race Tracker
 Campaign contributions from OpenSecrets
 Alexander (R-i) vs Tuke (D) graph of multiple polls from Pollster.com
 Official campaign websites
 Lamar Alexander, Republican nominee 
 Mark E. Clayton, Democratic candidate
 Kenneth Eaton, Democratic candidate
 Mike Padgett, Democratic candidate
 Bob Tuke, Democratic nominee 
 David "None of the Above" Gatchell, Independent candidate
 Ed Lawhorn, Independent candidate
 Daniel T. Lewis, Independent (Libertarian Party) candidate
 Chris Lugo, Independent (Green Party) candidate

2008
Tennessee
United States Senate